The Japanese destroyer {{nihongo|Aoi|葵|}} was one of 21 s built for the Imperial Japanese Navy (IJN) in the late 1910s. She was converted into a patrol boat in 1940 and was lost during the Battle of Wake Island shortly after the beginning of the Pacific War in December 1941.

Design and description
The Momi class was designed with higher speed and better seakeeping than the preceding  second-class destroyers. Aoi was powered by two Brown-Curtis geared steam turbines, each driving one propeller shaft using steam provided by three Kampon water-tube boilers. Their crew consisted of 110 officers and crewmen.

The main armament of the Momi-class ships consisted of three  Type 3 guns in single mounts; one gun forward of the well deck, one between the two funnels, and the last gun atop the aft superstructure. The guns were numbered '1' to '3' from front to rear. The ships carried two above-water twin sets of  torpedo tubes; one mount was in the well deck between the forward superstructure and the bow gun and the other between the aft funnel and aft superstructure.

In 1940, Aoi was converted into a patrol boat. Her torpedo tubes, minesweeping gear, and aft 12 cm gun were removed in exchange for two triple mounts for license-built  Type 96 light AA guns and 60 depth charges.

Construction and career
Aoi, built at the Kawasaki Dockyard Co. shipyard in Kobe, was laid down on 1 April 1920, launched on 9 November 1920 and completed on 20 December 1920. During 1940, she was converted into a patrol boat and was renamed Patrol Boat No. 32 on 1 April 1940. The ship was deliberately run aground on 23 December 1941 during the second Battle of Wake Island at coordinates  to allow her Special Naval Landing Force troops to disembark. Nearby Marine anti-aircraft guns then set her on fire. Patrol Boat No. 32 was struck from the Navy List on 15 January 1942.

Notes

References

1920 ships
Ships built by Kawasaki Heavy Industries
Momi-class destroyers
Maritime incidents in December 1941
World War II shipwrecks in the Pacific Ocean